John Converse Starkweather (February 23, 1829November 15, 1890) was a general in the Union Army during the American Civil War.

Early life and career
John C. Starkweather was born in Cooperstown, New York, the eldest son of George A. Starkweather and Elizabeth (Converse) Starkweather.  He married Louisa A. Hallett, the daughter of William P. and Rachel Ray Hallet. He graduated from Union College, class of 1850, and studied law and was admitted to the bar in 1857.  He moved to Milwaukee, Wisconsin, and practiced law there until 1861.

Civil War
On May 17, 1861, he was made colonel of the 1st Wisconsin Volunteer Infantry Regiment (3 Months) and took part in the battles of Battle of Hoke's Run (also known as Falling Waters), July 2, 1861, and of Edmunds Ferry, July 29, 1861. He was mustered out on August 21, 1861.

Re-organizing his regiment for three years, by special order of the War Department, he again enlisted and served in Kentucky and northern Alabama. In command of a brigade, he participated creditably in the Battle of Perryville, October 8, 1862.  He was also engaged in the Battle of Stones River and the Battle of Chickamauga where he was wounded. He was promoted to brigadier general on July 17, 1863.

He served in the court-martial that tried General William Alexander Hammond, Surgeon General of the United States Army, and after commanding several posts in Tennessee and Alabama, he was mustered out of the army on May 11, 1865.

Postbellum career
He and his wife Louisa had six children—Walter Augustus, George Anson, Mabel Ray, Rachel Field, Francis Morgan, and Bessie Bush.

After farming for several years in Wisconsin and occupying posts of importance and trust, he moved to Washington, D.C., where he practiced law until his death there in 1890.

See also

List of American Civil War generals (Union)

References

External links

John Converse Starkweather. findagrave.com

|-

1829 births
1890 deaths
People from Cooperstown, New York
Military personnel from Milwaukee
Union Army generals
People of Wisconsin in the American Civil War
New York (state) lawyers
Wisconsin lawyers
19th-century American lawyers